The Dixie Series was an interleague postseason series between the playoff champions of Minor League Baseball's Southern Association (SA) and Texas League (TL). The best-of-seven series was held at the conclusion of each season from 1920 to 1958, with the exception of 1943 to 1945 due to World War II. It was revived by the Dixie Association for one year in 1967, pitting the Texas League champion against the Southern League (SL) champion.

With 19 wins, Texas League teams won the most Dixie Series championships, while 17 were won by the Southern Association and 1 by the Southern League. The Fort Worth Cats won eight Dixie Series, more than any other team. They are followed by the Birmingham Barons (6); the Houston Buffaloes and Nashville Vols (4); the Dallas Rangers (3); the Atlanta Crackers, Mobile Bears, and New Orleans Pelicans (2); and the Chattanooga Lookouts, Memphis Chicks, Oklahoma City Indians, San Antonio Missions, Tulsa Oilers, and Wichita Falls Spudders (1).

Four Dixie Series were won by teams affiliated with the St. Louis Cardinals of Major League Baseball (MLB), more than any other major league organization. They are followed by the Boston Red Sox, Brooklyn Dodgers, Cleveland Indians, and Detroit Tigers organizations (2); and the Chicago Cubs, Chicago White Sox, Kansas City Athletics, Milwaukee Braves, St. Louis Browns, and Washington Senators organizations (1). Nineteen Dixie Series were won by teams which were not affiliated with any MLB organization.

Results

Appearances by team

See also
List of Southern Association champions
List of Southern League champions
List of Texas League champions

References
Specific

General

Defunct baseball competitions in the United States
Minor league baseball playoffs and champions
Southern Association
Southern League (1964–present)
Texas League